Ababel Yeshaneh Birhane (born 22 July 1991) is an Ethiopian long-distance runner who competes in track, road and cross country events. She represented her country in the 10,000 metres at the 2013 World Championships in Athletics, coming ninth, and ranked fifth in the world on time that year. She was a team silver medallist at the African Cross Country Championships in 2014 and finished 14th in the 5000 metres at the 2016 Olympic Games.

On 21 February 2020, she broke the world record in the half marathon, clocking 1:04:31 at the RAK Half-Marathon in Ras Al Khaimah, United Arab Emirates.

She has a marathon best of 2:20:51 set at the 2019 Chicago Marathon where she finished second.

Career
While running in Ethiopia, she joined the Ethiopian Defense Forces sports club. She began to compete outside of Ethiopia in 2011, starting with a win at the Vadodara Half Marathon in India. She followed this with a win at the Stramilano in a best of 69:54 minutes, then had a runner-up finish at the Nice Half Marathon a few weeks later. She made her marathon debut that year, placing sixth at the Turin Marathon with a time of 2:34:36 hours in November. She ran sparingly in 2012, though she did set a 5000 metres track best of 15:17.05 minutes.

Ababel came third at the Milan Marathon in April 2013, setting a new best of 2:33:10 hours. However, it was on the track that she made her impact. At the Golden Spike Ostrava meeting she was part of the most competitive 10,000 metres race of the season and her time of 30:35.91 minutes for fourth eventually ranked her fifth in the world on time that year. The performances earned her a place on the Ethiopian team for the 2013 World Championships in Athletics, after world leader Meseret Defar decided to focus on the 5000 m. In the 10,000 m world final she was in the main pack until the halfway point before drifting back to ninth place overall on her international debut.

Her first international medal came at the 2014 African Cross Country Championships. She finished sixth in the women's race which brought her a silver medal as part of the Ethiopian women's team led by Tadelech Bekele. After this she returned to the roads, coming fourth at the Portugal Half Marathon. At the start of 2015 she won the half marathon section of the Ooredoo Marathon in Doha.

She competed in the women's marathon at the 2022 World Athletics Championships held in Eugene, Oregon, United States.

International competitions

References

External links

 
 

Living people
1991 births
Ethiopian female long-distance runners
Ethiopian female marathon runners
World Athletics Championships athletes for Ethiopia
Athletes (track and field) at the 2016 Summer Olympics
Olympic athletes of Ethiopia
20th-century Ethiopian women
21st-century Ethiopian women